The 1955–56 Boston Bruins season was the Bruins' 32nd season in the NHL.

Offseason

Regular season

Final standings

Record vs. opponents

Schedule and results

Playoffs
The Bruins failed to make the playoffsleading to a moment of NHL history.

As was then customary for the Bruins when missing the playoffs, the team played an exhibition tour. This resulted in the first ever outdoor game in Canada involving an NHL team, the 1956 Boston Bruins exhibition game in Newfoundland, on the night of April 9, 1956.

Player statistics

Regular season
Scoring

Goaltending

Awards and records

Transactions

See also
1955–56 NHL season

References

External links

Boston Bruins seasons
Boston Bruins
Boston Bruins
Boston Bruins
Boston Bruins
1950s in Boston